The Roman Catholic Diocese of Foz do Iguaçu is a diocese located in the city of Foz do Iguaçu in the Ecclesiastical province of Cascavel in Brazil.

History
 May 10, 1926: Established as Territorial Prelature of Foz do Iguaçu from the Diocese of Curitiba
 1959: Suppressed (to Diocese of Campo Mourão and Diocese of Toledo)
 May 5, 1978: Restored as Diocese of Foz do Iguaçu from the Diocese of Toledo

Leadership

Ordinaries, in reverse chronological order
 Bishops of Foz do Iguaçu (Roman rite)
 Bishop Sérgio de Deus Borges (2019.09.07 – ...)
 Bishop Dirceu Vegini (2010.10.20 – 2018.09.29)
 Bishop Laurindo Guizzardi, C.S. (1982.02.12 – 2010.10.20)
 Bishop Olívio Aurélio Fazza, S.V.D. (1978.05.05 – 2001.11.28)
 Prelates of Foz do Iguaçu (Roman Rite) 
 Bishop Manoel Könner, S.V.D. (1947.12.13 – 1959.06.20)
 Fr. Manoel Könner, S.V.D. (later Bishop) (Apostolic Administrator 1940.02.17 – 1947.12.13)

References
 GCatholic.org
 Catholic Hierarchy
 Diocese website (Portuguese)

Roman Catholic dioceses in Brazil
Foz do Iguacu, Roman Catholic Diocese of
Christian organizations established in 1926
Roman Catholic dioceses and prelatures established in the 20th century
Foz do Iguaçu